William Bernard may refer to:

 William Bernard (sailor) ( 1849), sailor known as the notorious "Barnacle Bill" of American yore
 William Bayle Bernard (1807–1875), American-born London playwright and drama critic
 William Larkins Bernard (1843–1922), English architect
 William Smyth Bernard (1792–1863), Irish politician

See also
 Billy Bernard (born 1991), Luxembourger international footballer 
 Will Bernard, American guitarist and band leader